Arteq Qelich Cheshmeh (also Romanized as Ārteq Qelīch Cheshmeh; also known as Ārteqqelīch Cheshmeh) is a village in Atrak Rural District, Dashli Borun District, Gonbad-e Qabus County, Golestan Province, Iran. At the 2006 census, its population was 90, in 20 families.

References 

Populated places in Gonbad-e Kavus County